Wynn Zaw Htun (born 15 September 1982) is a Burmese chess International Master. Currently the top ranked player in Myanmar, Wynn Zaw Htun has won the Myanmar National Chess Championship nine times: in 2000, 2004, 2006, 2013–2015, and 2017–2019

References

External links
 

1982 births
Living people
Burmese chess players
Chess International Masters
Southeast Asian Games medalists in chess
Southeast Asian Games silver medalists for Myanmar
Competitors at the 2011 Southeast Asian Games
20th-century Burmese people
21st-century Burmese people